For the Summer Olympics, there are eight venues that have or will have hosted table tennis.

References

 
Table
Venues
Olympic venues